Tangzhou may refer to:

Tangzhou, Jiangxi (塘洲), a town in Taihe County, Jiangxi, China
Tang Prefecture (唐州) in Henan
Tang Prefecture (唐州) in Shanxi

See also
Tang (disambiguation)